Ambattar (also known by many other names) is a Tamil caste found in the Indian state of Tamil Nadu and northeastern part of Sri Lanka. Their traditional occupations are physicians, midwives and barbers. Leslie in his comparative study of Asian medical systems explains that Vaidya title is adopted by members of Ambathans in Tamil Nadu, only some of them practice medicines and are more highly esteemed than the others who are barbers.

Etymology and synonyms 
The name Ambattar is a Tamilised word originally from Sanskrit word Ambashtha. The word is derived from the two Sanskrit words amba meaning "near" and stha meaning "to stand" thus meaning "one who stands nearby" in reference to their occupation as barbers and physicians.

They have also been referred to as Maruttuvar, Pariyari and Vaidiyar, which are all synonyms for physicians. Other names are also synonymous with Ambattar, including Navidhar, Nasuvan, Chakkara Kathi and Kudimagan. According to one member of the caste, the name used varies from one village to another.

History

Myth 
According to Manusmriti, an ancient Hindu text, the Ambattar or Ambashtha are the offspring of a Brahmin father and a Vaishya mother.

Ancient India 
Mukharji explains that the term was also used for identifying certain ethnic groups in ancient Indian history and protohistory. They find contemporary mention in Indian, Greek and Roman sources. An Ambashtha king named Narada has been mentioned in Aitreya Brahama in 500 BC. Greek and Roman sources also mention a republic kingdom of Ambashtha people in the Chenab region during the time of Alexander's invasion. The epic Mahabharata mentions Ambashtha living in Punjab region and Brihaspati Artha Shashtra mentions their region between Kashmir and Sind. Later around 140 AD, Ptolemy mentions Ambashtha settlement in Mekala region, so does Markandeya Purana and Brihat Samhita. These sources support their chronological southward migration till Mekala. BP Sinha, an eminent archeologist, details the bifurcation in their migration from Mekala in present-day Madhya Pradesh. One eastward from Mekala and the other towards southward (called Ambattar). From Mekala the Ambashtha appear to migrate to Bihar and concentrated today in that region, mostly in central districts of Bihar. A community called Ambashtha exists as a sub-caste of Kayastha in Bihar. Sinha further details that some migrated to Bengal also and a community called Vaidya exists there which according to the code of Manu set for the profession of physicians. Thereby making the Ambattar distantly related to Baidya of eastern India, Kayastha of central and northern India and Khatri of northern and  northwestern India.

Migration 
Sinha suggests that the Ambashtha who migrated southward initially carried out the profession of physicians but later took up other professions such as that of barbers. The social life of Tamil Ambashtha is regulated by Brahmanical code, who act as priest in their marriage ceremonies. Like the orthodox North-Indian upper castes, traditionally widow remarriage was not there and the dead are cremated. They perform as priests in marriage ceremonies of the Vellas of Salem district. They may be Shaiva or Vaishnava. The Vaishnava abstain from meat, fish and liquor. Their population is quite large in Salem district. Similar group is also found in South Travencore who work as physicians, midwives, barbers and priests. They have respectable social status. Ambashtha held high positions during Chalukya and Pandya kingdoms.

Early Tamil history 
The Siddhars, the ancient Tamil physicians who claimed to have attained siddhi, hailed mostly from the Ambattar community.

Sri Lanka 
According to the folklore of the Ambattar of Sri Lanka, they arrived in the Jaffna Kingdom as attendants of warriors. Since they came without their wives, they married Sri Lankan Vellalar women.

See also 

 Velakkathala Nair
 Isai Vellalar

References 

Social groups of Tamil Nadu
Sri Lankan Tamil castes